Deori may refer to:

 Deori, Bilaspur district, a town in Chhattisgarh
 Deori, Gondia, a town in Maharashtra
 Deori, Sagar, a town in Madhya Pradesh
 Deori, Shahdol, a town in Madhya Pradesh
 Deori, Jabalpur, Jabalpur district, a town in Madhya Pradesh
 Deori block in Giridih district, Jharkhand
 Deori, Giridih, in Jharkhand
 Deori people of Assam
 Deori language, their language

See also 
 Deoria (disambiguation)
 Deuri (disambiguation)

Language and nationality disambiguation pages